Joseph-Adolphe Gandy (25 February 1839 – 26 March 1909) was a member of Paris Foreign Missions Society and was the archbishop of Archdiocese of Pondicherry. On 16 March 1883 he was appointed as a Coadjutor Vicar Apostolic to succeed Bishop Laouënan. He was consecrated as a bishop on 9 September 1883 with Tricale as his titular see. When Pope Leo XII established Catholic hierarchy in India, he was appointed as the Coadjutor Archbishop of Pondicherry on 15 January 1889. After the death of Mgr. Laouënan he succeed him on 29 September 1892. He was the archbishop until his death on 26 March 1909. He was succeeded by Elie-Jean-Joseph Morel.

Early life

He was born 25 February 1839 at St. Anne, Estrablin, which at that time was part of the Châtonnay; He studied at the seminary in La Côte-Saint-André and at the major seminary in Grenoble, where he was ordained priest on 13 July 1862. After two years as vicar at St. Symphorien d'Ozon, he entered the Seminary of Paris Foreign Missions Society on 7 August 1866.

In India
He left for Pondicherry Mission on 15 March 1867. There he first worked as a teacher. In December 1870 Bishop Laouënan sent him to  district of Kottapalayam, and in 1872, in that of Koneripatti where he remained for fifteen years. Despite many difficulties, he established a Christian colony, built a rectory, and laid the foundations of a church;

As a Bishop
He was chosen as coadjutor and was appointed Bishop of Tricala 16 March 1883, and consecrated as the titular Bishop of Tricale on 9 September of the same year in Pondicherry. He then while working as a professor of theology at the seminary also took care of district administration. He employed his time as a coadjutor to visit the mission and gaining complete knowledge of it. On 15 January 1889, he was named the Coadjutor Archbishop of Pondicherry with Claudiopolis in Honoriade as his titular. On 29 September 1892, he succeeded deceased Mgr. Laouenan as the Archbishop of Pondicherry. During his tenure as the Archbishop, he gave importance to creating indigenous priests.

Upon his request on 1 September 1899, Pope Leo XIII erected the Diocese of Kumbakonam by dividing the Archdiociese of Pondicherry.

Death

In July 1908, the bishops of the ecclesiastical province of Pondicherry met to discuss general administrative matters; Although Mgr. Gandy seemed very tired, he was active. He died in Yercaud 25 March 1909 and was buried in Pondicherry Cathedral Cemetery.

The short biography of Mrg. Gandy at the MEP Archives ends as:

References

 

 

 

1839 births
1909 deaths
19th-century Roman Catholic bishops in India
20th-century Roman Catholic bishops in India
French Roman Catholic missionaries
Paris Foreign Missions Society missionaries
French Roman Catholic bishops in Asia
Roman Catholic archbishops of Pondicherry and Cuddalore
Roman Catholic missionaries in India
French expatriates in India
People from Isère